Ngezi River may refer to:

 Ngezi River (Masvingo), a tributary of the Runde River, Zimbabwe
 Ngezi River (Midlands), a tributary of the Sebakwe River, Zimbabwe